Mazzilli is a surname. People with the surname include:
 Agustín Mazzilli (born 1989), Argentine field hockey player
 Frank Mazzilli (born 1962) Canadian politician
 Lee Mazzilli (born 1955), American baseball player
 L. J. Mazzilli (born 1990), American baseball player
 Pascoal Ranieri Mazzilli (1910–1975), Brazilian politician